The Ramanujan machine is a specialised software package, developed by a team of scientists at the Technion: Israeli Institute of Technology, to discover new formulas in mathematics. It has been named after the Indian mathematician Srinivasa Ramanujan because it supposedly imitates the thought process of Ramanujan in his discovery of hundreds of formulas.
The machine has produced several conjectures in the form of continued fraction expansions of expressions involving some of the most important constants in mathematics like e and π (pi). Some of these conjectures produced by the Ramanujan machine have subsequently been proved true. The others continue to remain as conjectures. The software was conceptualised and developed by a group of undergraduates of the Technion under the guidance of Ido Kaminer, an Electrical engineering faculty member of Technion. The details of the machine were published online on 3 February 2021 in the journal Nature.

According to George Andrews, an expert on the mathematics of Ramanujan, even though some of the results produced by the Ramanujan machine are amazing and difficult to prove,  the results produced by the machine are not of the caliber of Ramanujan and so calling the software the Ramanujan machine is slightly outrageous. Doron Zeilberger, an Israeli mathematician, has opined that the Ramanujan machine is a harbinger of a new methodology of doing mathematics.

Formulas discovered by the Ramanujan machine
The following are some of the formulas discovered by the Ramanujan machine which have been later proved to be true:

The following are some of the many formulas conjectured by the Ramanujan machine whose truth or falsity has not yet been established:

External links
Website of the Ramanujan machine project: The Ramanujan Machine: Using algorithms to discover new mathematics

References